Damir Mikec (born 31 March 1984) is a Serbian sport shooter.

Biography
Mikec represented Serbia at the 2008 Summer Olympics in Beijing, People's Republic of China. He earned his qualification by finishing 6th at the 2007 World Cup #1 Rifle, Pistol in Fort Benning, United States of America. In Beijing, Mikec reached the final in 50 metre pistol and finished 7th. In 10 metre air pistol he missed the final by a one-point margin and finished 13th.

Mikec won a silver medal in 50 metre pistol at the 2009 ISSF World Cup in Munich.

At the 2012 Summer Olympics, he came as world's number one at the world rank list, again competed in the 10 metre air pistol and the 50 metre pistol, finishing in 17th and 16th positions respectively.

At the 2020 Summer Olympics, he competed in the 10 metre air pistol finishing second, granting Serbia its first medal at the Games.

Personal life
Mikec is of paternal Slovene descent. His paternal grandparents hail from Novo Mesto, but due to his grandfather's engagement in the Yugoslav People's Army, his father was born in Bitola. His father was in the Army as well, and met his mother, a discus thrower, in Senta while located there at the time. Because of his older brothers Igor and Goran's respiratory problems, his family moved to Split–where he was born–due to the benefits of sea air and climate. After the outbreak of the Croatian War of Independence, his family moved to Herceg Novi. Finally, in 1997, his family moved to Petlovo Brdo, Belgrade, where he finished the last grade of primary school and started secondary school. After the NATO bombing of Yugoslavia, he started training shooting at the urging of his mother and Srećko Pejović.

He is married to Salvadoran sports shooter Melissa Pérez, whom he met in 2005. They married in 2011 in the Ružica Church. Despite plans for another wedding in El Salvador, the Catholic Church there would not agree on a compromise due to Mikec's Eastern Orthodox faith, unlike the Serbian Orthodox Church who did agree on a compromise due to Pérez's Roman Catholic faith. The couple have two children, a son Milan Ricardo (b. 2015) and Mia Vanessa (b. 2020).

References

External links

Profile at Olympic Committee of Serbia

1984 births
Sportspeople from Split, Croatia
People from Herceg Novi
Sportspeople from Belgrade
Serbian people of Slovenian descent
Serbian male sport shooters
ISSF pistol shooters
Olympic shooters of Serbia
Shooters at the 2008 Summer Olympics
Shooters at the 2012 Summer Olympics
Shooters at the 2016 Summer Olympics
Shooters at the 2020 Summer Olympics
Living people
Shooters at the 2015 European Games
European champions for Serbia
European Games gold medalists for Serbia
European Games medalists in shooting
Mediterranean Games gold medalists for Serbia
Mediterranean Games silver medalists for Serbia
Mediterranean Games bronze medalists for Serbia
Competitors at the 2005 Mediterranean Games
Competitors at the 2009 Mediterranean Games
Competitors at the 2013 Mediterranean Games
Competitors at the 2018 Mediterranean Games
Competitors at the 2022 Mediterranean Games
Universiade medalists in shooting
Mediterranean Games medalists in shooting
Universiade silver medalists for Serbia
Shooters at the 2019 European Games
European Games silver medalists for Serbia
Medalists at the 2011 Summer Universiade
Medalists at the 2020 Summer Olympics
Olympic silver medalists for Serbia
Olympic medalists in shooting
20th-century Serbian people
21st-century Serbian people